The Badminton Federation of Armenia, is the regulating body of badminton in Armenia, governed by the Armenian Olympic Committee. The headquarters of the federation is located in Yerevan.

History
The Federation was established in 1992 and is currently led by president Ashot Aghababyan. The Federation oversees the training of badminton specialists and organizes badminton tournaments throughout the country. The Armenia national badminton team participates in various European, international, and Olympic level badminton competitions, including the European Badminton Championships and the BWF World Championships. The Federation is a full member of Badminton Europe and the Badminton World Federation.

The Federation often attends the World Badminton Federation's annual congress.

See also 
 Sport in Armenia

References

External links 
 Badminton Federation of Armenia official website
 Badminton Federation of Armenia on Facebook

Sports governing bodies in Armenia
Badminton in Armenia
National members of the Badminton World Federation